Sultan Abdul Hakkul Mubin (also known as Abdul Mubin) was the thirteenth Sultan of Brunei. He was involved in the Brunei Civil War. He ruled from 1660 to 1673 after killing Sultan Muhammad Ali. He was later killed and succeeded by Sultan Muhyiddin.

Reign
Abdul Hakkul Mubin was once known as Pengiran Bendahara  Abdul Mubin. However, in 1660 his son was killed by the son of the reigning Sultan Muhammad Ali, Pengiran Muda Bongsu. In revenge he killed Muhammad Ali and took the throne, taking the name Abdul Hakkul Mubin. He tried to appease the previous Sultan's followers by appointing Muhammad Ali's nephew and son-in-law, Muhyiddin, as the new Bendahara ("Chief Minister"). However Muhammad Ali's supporters convinced Muhyiddin to take revenge sparking the Brunei Civil War. Abdul Hakkul Mubin's rule, and the Brunei Civil War ended with his death and Muhyiddin's victory in 1673.

References

17th-century Sultans of Brunei
Year of birth missing
Year of death missing